Momo is a department of Northwest Province in Cameroon. The department covers an area of 1792 km and as of 2005 had a total population of 138,693. It is the ethnic home of the Widikum People. The capital of the department lies at Mbengwi.

Subdivisions
The department is divided administratively into 5 communes and in turn into villages.

Communes 
 Andek
 Batibo
 Mbengwi 
 Njikwa
 Widikum-Boffe (Widikum)

Villages 
 Anong
 Acha-Tugi
 Ashong
 Bessi
 Bome
 Batibo
 Banya
 Efah
 Ewoh
 Guneku
 Konda
 Kuruku
 Mbemi
 Oshum
 Oshie
 Mbengwi
 Menka
 Munam
 Ngie
 Njah-Etu
 Njindom
 Njinibi
 Ngwo
 Nyenjei
 Nyanek
 Mbunjei
 Sang
 Wumnebit
 Wumnemburg
 Zang-Tebi
 Zang-Tembeng
 Ngyenmuwah
 TUDIG
 Kai
Fpun
Tuanyang

References

Departments of Cameroon
Northwest Region (Cameroon)